is a Japanese businessman and executive. He is the sixth and current president of the video game company Nintendo in Japan. He took over as company president in June 2018, succeeding Tatsumi Kimishima.

Early life 
Furukawa was born in Tokyo, Japan as the son of illustrator Taku Furukawa on January 10, 1972. He grew up playing games on Nintendo's Famicom console. Furukawa is a graduate of Kunitachi Senior High School, and graduated from Waseda University's School of Political Science and Economics in 1994.

Career 
In 1994, he joined Nintendo and worked as an accountant at the European headquarters for a decade. By the mid-2010s, he rose up in the corporate office, working in global marketing, the executive department. He also became an outside director of the partly owned The Pokémon Company as the Nintendo representative in the board of directors of the company, due to Nintendo owning 32% shares in the joint venture.

In 2015, he was promoted to the General Manager of Corporate Planning Department. In June 2016, with some company restructuring he joined the Nintendo Board of Directors as the Managing Executive Officer of the Corporate Analysis & Administration Division.  Furukawa is fluent in English, and was involved in the development of and release manager of the Nintendo Switch. On June 28, 2018, he succeeded Tatsumi Kimishima as company president, becoming the sixth one in Nintendo's history.

References

Living people
1972 births
Japanese chairpersons of corporations
Japanese chief executives
Japanese video game businesspeople
Nintendo people
People from Tokyo
Waseda University alumni
21st-century Japanese businesspeople